Syritta leucopleura is a species of syrphid fly in the family Syrphidae.

Distribution
Madagascar.

References

Eristalinae
Diptera of Africa
Taxa named by Jacques-Marie-Frangile Bigot
Insects described in 1859